is a Japanese politician of the Liberal Democratic Party, a member of the House of Councillors in the Diet (national legislature). A native of Chichibu District, Saitama and graduate of Josai Dental University (predecessor of Meikai University), he was elected to the House of Councillors for the first time in 2003 after serving in the assembly of Saitama Prefecture for three terms.

References

External links 
 Official website in Japanese.

Members of the House of Councillors (Japan)
Living people
1953 births
Liberal Democratic Party (Japan) politicians